The Southwestern Railroad was a 19th-century railway company in the U.S. state of Kentucky. It operated from  until , when it was incorporated into the Louisville Southern Railroad. It later made up part of the Southern Railway, and its former rights-of-way currently form parts of the class-I Norfolk Southern system.

See also
 List of Kentucky railroads

Defunct Kentucky railroads
Defunct companies based in Kentucky